Hezekiah ben Obadiah was a hypothetical ruler of the Khazars, probably in the mid ninth century CE. He was the son of Obadiah, the descendant of Bulan who brought rabbinical scholars to and built yeshivot in Khazaria. 
Nothing  is known about Hezekiah's reign and the historical authenticity and accuracy  of the only document mentioning his name has been questioned. As with other Bulanid rulers, it is unclear whether Hezekiah was Khagan or Khagan Bek of the Khazars, although the latter is more likely.

Hezekiah was succeeded by his son Menasseh I.

References

Sources
Kevin Alan Brook. The Jews of Khazaria. 2nd ed. Rowman & Littlefield Publishers, Inc, 2006.
Douglas M. Dunlop, The History of the Jewish Khazars, Princeton, N.J.: Princeton University Press, 1954.
Norman Golb and Omeljan Pritsak, Khazarian Hebrew Documents of the Tenth Century. Ithaca: Cornell Univ. Press, 1982.

Khazar rulers
9th-century rulers in Europe
Jewish monarchs
9th-century Jews